The Cleveland State Vikings baseball team represented Cleveland State University in the sport of baseball. The Cleveland State Vikings competed in Division I of the National Collegiate Athletics Association (NCAA) and in the Horizon League. Baseball at Cleveland State was played for a total of 69 seasons. On May 2, 2011 Clevleland State University announced that they would eliminate the baseball team. The reasons cited were budget concerns as well as the difficulty of having a baseball team in the northern United States with the season starting earlier and earlier and favoring teams in the warmer southern United States.

Regular season
Mid-Continent Conference Team Championships (2):
1986, 1989
Horizon League Team Championships (0):

Tournament
Mid-Continent Conference Team Championships (0):
Horizon League Team Championships (0):

Record by year

NCAA Championship history

Head coaching history

References